United Nations Security Council Resolution 2087, adopted unanimously on January 22, 2013, after recalling all previous relevant resolutions on the situation concerning North Korea, including resolutions 825 (1993), 1540 (2004), 1695 (2006), 1718 (2006), and 1874 (2009), the Council condemned the December 12, 2012 rocket launch by the Democratic People's Republic of Korea.

See also
 2013 North Korean nuclear test
 2013 North Korean cargo ship confrontation in Panama
 List of United Nations Security Council Resolutions 2001 to 2100 (2011–present)

References

External links
Text of the Resolution at undocs.org

2013 United Nations Security Council resolutions
United Nations Security Council resolutions concerning North Korea
2013 in North Korea
Nuclear program of North Korea
January 2013 events
Sanctions against North Korea